In geometry, the small ditrigonal dodecicosidodecahedron (or small dodekified icosidodecahedron) is a nonconvex uniform polyhedron, indexed as U43. It has 44 faces (20 triangles, 12 pentagrams and 12 decagons), 120 edges, and 60 vertices. Its vertex figure is a crossed quadrilateral.

Related polyhedra 

It shares its vertex arrangement with the great stellated truncated dodecahedron. It additionally shares its edges with the small icosicosidodecahedron (having the triangular and pentagrammic faces in common) and the small dodecicosahedron (having the decagonal faces in common).

See also 
 List of uniform polyhedra

References

External links 
 

Uniform polyhedra